Lars Eric "Lasse" Mattsson is a guitarist, songwriter and producer living in Godby, Åland, Finland.

Career

Initially influenced by the classic hard rock of the late 60s and 70s like Jimi Hendrix, Richie Blackmore, Johnny Winter but also Al DiMeola, Mattsson later became one of the early developers of the neoclassical metal genre. Mattsson was discovered by Mike Varney (Guitar Player Magazine and Shrapnel Records) in 1985. After playing and touring with various local hard rock bands Mattsson recorded and released the 4 track vinyl EP “Can’t Go On Without Your Love” in 1987. Soon after this Mattsson signed to Black Dragon Records, a French indie label for which he recorded 3 albums Eternity (1988), No Surrender (1989), and the all-instrumental Electric Voodoo (1991). Eternity and No Surrender were released in Japan by FEMS, while the instrumental Electric Voodoo was picked up by Leviathan Records in the USA and released under the Title “The Exciter” in 1992, and then in 1995, it was released in Asia by SKC.

In 1992 Mattsson teamed up with Swedish singer Conny Lind who had been in Los Angeles working with Alex Masi and together with drummer Tony Mattsson and Bass player Michael Ahlskog they formed the band 'Vision' and recorded 1992's album 'Lars Eric Mattsson's Vision'. The year after Vision recorded a follow-up album, which was never released due to the label's coming bankruptcy and the band eventually split up. Around 1994 when Mattsson was playing in cover bands doing blues classics and Hendrix covers he got in contact with another Swedish singer, Björn Lodin, who had released some albums with his own band Baltimore. As the band split up Björn joined forces with Lars and recorded the 1995's album 'Astral Groove', which was blues-based and quite different from Mattsson's previous releases. However, the band split up too soon and Mattsson was considering quitting music completely for a while.

In 1996 Lars wanted to give 'Vision' a second chance and recorded the album 'Till the End of Time' which was his most laid-back melodic- almost AOR - release ever. The album got very good reactions and was living proof that melodic hard rock still had an audience. Singer Randolph Reymers made his debut as lead singer after having sung backing vocals on several albums before Vision.

In the autumn 1999 Lars began writing for another album and invited some friends and musicians to guest on the project. These included: Patrick Ronda (Jean Michel Jarre) Rob Johnson (Magnitude 9), Erik Norlander (Lana Lane, Rocket Scientists) Pär Lindh (Pär Lindh Project) Esa Pietilä, and more... The new 70+ minute long opus consists of 14 new compositions jam-packed with Intense musical ideas influenced by classical music, classic hard rock, heavy metal, progressive rock/metal with many virtuoso performances from Lars and his guests. The album has soft melodic ballads and odd-meter riffing.

In 2000 Lars put together a progressive band called 'Condition Red', the debut album features keyboard maestro Derek Sherinian (ex- Alice Cooper/Dream Theater) and Lars’ friend Alex Masi (on additional guitars). Lars's next project was to record a new Mattsson album, this time with ex-Balance of Power singer Lance King, and the result, 'Power Games' was released in 2003 and received fantastic reviews all over the world.

In 2003 Condition Red reformed to record and release their second album of progressive rock titled “II”, not too long after this Lars's band from the 1990s made a short comeback in 2004 with a new album “On the Edge”, however, Lars major work in 2004 was the new supergroup 'Book Of Reflections' which include singer Andy Engberg (ex-Lion's Share/Section A, etc...), Vitalij Kuprij, etc...but Lars biggest challenge this far was the progressive metal concept album/metal opera 'War' which was released in 2005 and which features: Mark Boals (Yngwie Malmsteen), Vitalij Kuprij, Lance King, Rene Janssen(Ayreon), Benny Jansson (Tears of Anger/Beyond Twilight), etc...

The same year also saw the first instrumental release in 10 years in the guise of the eclectic "Earthbound".  Mattsson found a new vein of creativity and by 2006 had completed "Book Of Reflections II : Unfold The Future" with vocals by Martin LeMar (Tomorrow's Eve) and Björn Jansson (Ride The Sky / Tears Of Anger), with additional guitar from Anand Mahangoe (Sphere Of Souls) and keyboards from Mistheria (solo, Bruce Dickinson, Angel Of Eden).

2008 saw Mattsson gearing up for the accessible symphonic and prog metal of 'Dream Child'.  Joining Lars was a new vocalist, the female Adrienn Antal whose voice saw Mattsson step out on a new path with its potent new sound for 2008.

2009 saw the re-release of a newly recorded and remastered version of No Surrender + Live which came with five bonus live tracks from the Mattsson archives. The album was warmly greeted by the press worldwide.  The rest of the year saw Lars write the follow-up to 'Dream Child'.

March 19, 2010, sees the release of 'Tango', the new album released under the Mattsson banner which again sees Adrienn Antal on vocals along with the new addition of Status Minor vocalist Markku Kuikka.  Lars spent countless hours putting together the intelligent and highly accomplished music which looks set to take the Mattsson name to a new fan base worldwide.

Never one to sit still Lars then set about composing the music for his next album, the all-instrumental 'Aurora Borealis' which is set for release on April 18, 2011.  This new album pushes the boundaries of a guitar with an orchestra context by delivering a very original take on the more traditional format used by the likes of Uli Jon Roth etc.

In 2012 Lars started working on his next album Epicentre, which was finished 12 months later and released in September 2013 as a digital download only. This 18 track album sees Lars handling all the vocals as well while musically Lars seems to have gone for shorter more accessible songs while still incorporating some new influences.

As Lars was celebrating 25 years since his two first albums were released in Japan 2014 saw Lars releasing several reissues and new compilations of previously unreleased material, such as both Condition Red albums in new versions, the two compilations Hot and Able 1983-85 and Let Me Rock You 1984-87 each containing 16 tracks from Lars early days. Also released in 2014 were a new version of the second Book of Reflections album Chapter II - Unfold the Future as well as new versions (all including bonus tracks) of "Earthbound" (October 24, 2014), "Eternity" (November 14,02014) and "No Surrender" (December 12, 2014).

In September 2015 Lars released his first all-acoustic album Songs From a Different Room, an album that had been in the making since late 2008. The album's ten intimate tracks all feature vocals by Lars and some of his best guitar playing to date. Also released in 2015: Condition Red's Beatles cover "Tomorrow Never Knows" as single.

In 2016 Condition Red released its third album Illusion of Truth, a progressive concept album which saw Lars handling all guitars, bass and vocals, just like as on the Condition Red single released a year before. This year Lars also released a four-track EP "Never Coming Home", the title track was a remix of a 1989 "No Surrender" album out take paired with two live tracks "The Exciter" and "Eternity" as well as the previously unreleased 1989 version of the title track.

On November 16 Lars returned with his first all-electric rock album in four years, Sand and Blood, and as it is thirty years after his debut EP Can't Go On Without Your Love, Lars decided to include a new recording of this classic (true to the original). The album also features a guest appearance by Adrienn Antal singing the album's last song, "Still Here Waiting".

Craven, Andy, Lion Music, 2013
Bello, Linda, ProgPulse, 2015
Carey, Andy, ProgPulse, 2017

Discography

Lars Eric Mattsson
Can't Go On Without Your Love (4 track EP)(1987)
Eternity (1988)
No Surrender (1989)
Electric Woodoo (aka The Exciter) (1991)
Obsession (1998)
Earthbound (2005)
No Surrender+Live (2009) (20th Annivessary Reissue)
Aurora Borealis: Concerto For Orchestra & Electric Guitar (2011)
Epicentre (2013)
Hot and Able (1983-85) (2014)
Let Me Rock You (1984-87) (2014)
Eternity - 25th Anniversary (2014)
No Surrender - 25th Anniversary (2014)
Songs From a Different Room (2015)
Never Coming Home (4 track EP)(2016) 
Sand and Blood (2017)
Vicky's Eyes (single) (2018)
Into the Unknown (2019)

Mattsson
Another Dimension (2000)
Power Games (2003)
War (2005)
Dream Child (2008)
Tango (2010)

Lars Eric Mattsson's Vision
Lars-Eric Mattsson's Vision (1992)(25th Anniversary Remaster released 2017)
Till The End of Time (1997)(20th Anniversary Remix released 2017)
The Best Of (2000)
On The Edge (2004)
II:1993(2017)
Live+ (2017)

Condition Red
Condition Red (2000) (Reissued new version in 2014)
Condition Red 2 (2004) (Reissued new version in 2014)
Tomorrow Never Knows (2015) (single, Beatles cover)
Illusion of Truth (2016)

Book of Reflections
Book of Reflections (2004)
Chapter II: Unfold the Future (2006)
Relentless Fighter (2012)

Astral Groove
Astral Groove (1995)

Eli
Darkness Will Fall (2008)

Roadhouse
Them Changes (single) (2015)

Tributes
Warmth in the Wilderness - A Tribute to Jason Becker  (2001)
Warmth in the Wilderness - A Tribute to Jason Becker II (2002)
Beyond Inspiration - A Tribute to Uli Jon Roth  (2001)
Blackmore's CastIe - A Tribute to Deep Purple and Rainbow  (2003)
Give Us Moore - Gary Moore Tribute  (2004)
The Spirit Lives On - The Music of Jimi Hendrix Revisited vol. I  (2004)
The Spirit Lives On - The Music of Jimi Hendrix Revisited vol. II  (2004)
Shawn Lane Remembered vol I  (2004)
Embrace the Sun - Japan Earthquake Benefit Album  (2011)
Lion Music Presents: Johann Sebastian Bach - Interpretations  (2015)
Lion Music Presents: W. A. Mozart - Reincarnated  (2015)
Lion Music Presents: Antonio Vivaldi - A New Season  (2016)
Lion Music Presents: L.V. Beethoven - Ode to Perfection  (2017)
Lion Music Presents: G.F. Handel - Baroque Passion  (2017)

Others
"Various Artists - Dream Ballads (2001)
Lalu - Oniric Metal (2005)
Iron Mask - Shadow of the Red Baron (2010)

References

http://www.progpulse.com

External links
 Lars-Eric Mattsson's official homepage
 Lion Music
 

Year of birth missing (living people)
Living people
Finnish rock guitarists
Finnish record producers
People from Åland